Mim Bour or Mim Rocky-Mountains are located  to the west of Mim in Asunafo North Municipal District of Ahafo region, Ghana.

Geography
The area around the mountains has been partially developed into a tourist site.

The site is served by an airstrip located east of the mountains.

According to oral tradition, the tallest of the Mim Bour mountains is the father while the other two are mother and child.

The male mountain
According to oral tradition, only the first chief of Mim has been able to climb to the summit, and he achieved this by some supernatural powers. Historical account states that, the Paramount Chief used to climb this steep mountain whenever he wanted to address his subjects or spy on enemy incursions. It is said that at the summit, he was able to see all the areas under his traditional authority and even as far as  Sunyani, Dormaa Ahenkro, Techiman, and Kumasi.

The female mountain
There is a staircase running to the summit of this mountain.

The female mountain has some interesting natural formations and beautiful scenery. At the summit, there is a reception centre, swimming pool, gardens, and orchard.  The top of the mountain gives panoramic views of the nearby airstrip, cashew plantation, and surrounding forests.

There is one hotel and guesthouses in Mim which accommodate tourists.

Transport
Mim is a regional centre, with direct routes to places such as Accra,  Kumasi, Sunyani, Kenyasi, Goaso, Nkrankwanta, Dormaa Ahenkro, and Sefwi Debiso.

Legends
Mim Bour is believed by the people of Mim to have some spiritual history surrounding their existence. The chiefs and people of Mim believe that the mountains serve as protective gods to them and surrounding towns.
During occasions such as the annual festival, the chiefs and people of Mim visit the Mim Bour to offer libation.

Gallery

References

Mountains of Ghana
Ahafo Region
Tourist attractions in Ghana